Azizur Rahman was a Member of the 3rd National Assembly of Pakistan as a representative of East Pakistan.

Career
Rahman was a Member of the 3rd National Assembly of Pakistan representing Comilla-II.

Rahman was the convenor of Comilla District Peace Committee formed in 1969.

References

Pakistani MNAs 1962–1965
Living people
Year of birth missing (living people)